Peremptor is a genus of parasitic flies in the family Tachinidae. There are at least three described species in Peremptor.

Species
These three species belong to the genus Peremptor:
 Peremptor egmonti Hutton, 1901
 Peremptor kumaraensis (Miller, 1913)
 Peremptor modicus (Hutton, 1901)

References

Further reading

 
 
 
 

Tachinidae
Articles created by Qbugbot